From a Birds Eye View is the second studio album by American rapper Cordae. It was released through Atlantic Records and Art@War on January 14, 2022. The album features guest appearances from Gunna, Lil Wayne, H.E.R., Lil Durk, Freddie Gibbs, Stevie Wonder, Eminem, and Roddy Ricch.

Background
In an August 2020 interview with Apple Music, Cordae said, "I'm like a hundred songs deep in. Like this next one, I'm really taking everything to a whole 'nother level. I really love doing music and perfecting my craft and I'm getting better every day. And the new music from here on out is going to show that".

Release and promotion
The bonus track on the album, "Gifted", features Roddy Ricch and was released on August 27, 2020, with a music video directed by Cole Bennett. The track was produced by Cordae, Bongo ByTheWay, and Ray Keys.

The album's second single, "Super", was released on October 7, 2021, alongside a music video. The single was produced by Jack Uriah, Kid Culture, and Jenius.

The album's third single, "Sinister", was released on December 3, 2021, along with a music video and a guest appearance from American rapper Lil Wayne. The single was produced by Hit-Boy.

Critical reception

From a Birds Eye View was met with positive reviews. At Metacritic, which assigns a normalized rating out of 100 to reviews from mainstream publications, the album received an average score of 71, based on seven reviews.

Track listing

Notes
  signifies a co-producer
  signifies an additional producer

Charts

References

2022 albums
Atlantic Records albums
Cordae albums
Albums produced by Boi-1da
Albums produced by Vinylz
Albums produced by Dem Jointz
Albums produced by Cardiak
Albums produced by Raphael Saadiq
Albums produced by Hit-Boy
Albums produced by Beat Butcha
Albums produced by Jake One
Albums produced by Take a Daytrip